Ellen Young (born 1952) is an American Democratic Party politician who represented the 22nd assembly district in the New York State Assembly. She was elected in 2006 to represent Flushing, Queens. She is currently the Chairwoman & CEO for the United Nations Global Peace Development Foundation.

She lost in the 2008 primary for reelection to Grace Meng. The election was hotly contested as Young was supported by John Liu (current New York State Senator) and Meng was supported by her father, previous Assemblyman Jimmy Meng.

Young came to New York at the age of 25 from Taiwan after graduating from Takming College in Taipei. She became the first Asian woman elected to the state legislature. She had a more substantial record than many first-term Assembly members, by passing five bills into law, including a measure to extend senior-citizen services. Therefore, Young became the first Asian American to pass a law in New York State. During her term in the New York State Legislature, Ellen obtained an 83% increase in spending for her district while the total budget of New York State was cut by 20%. She also presided over the body as speaker pro-tempore, a special honor.

After a lengthy recovery from a near-fatal bicycling accident in her Assembly District, Young was forced to direct her energy and expertise elsewhere. She enrolled at the St. John's University Institute of Asian Studies, earning her master's degree with a Certificate of Academic Excellence in 2012.

Young was also appointed to the New York State Supreme Court Grievance Committee for the Second, Eleventh and Thirteenth Judicial District, serving two terms running from 2011 to 2019.

In March 2020, Ellen obtained thousands of pieces of personal protective equipment from all over the world and distributed them to New Yorkers. As early as March 2020, Young advocated for setting up one of the first free COVID-19 testing stations in the nation in New York City. Throughout the COVID-19 pandemic, she continued working to set up free community testing sites all across the United States of America.

References

External links 
 Young's response to the 2008 Candidate Questionnaire for State Senate and Assembly from the 504 Democratic Club of New York City

1952 births
Living people
American politicians of Taiwanese descent
American women of Taiwanese descent in politics
Asian-American people in New York (state) politics
Democratic Party members of the New York State Assembly
People from Queens, New York
Women state legislators in New York (state)
Taiwanese emigrants to the United States
21st-century American women